Noor TV or Nour TV is a name for several TV channels:

Entertainment
Noor TV (US), a US based Afghan satellite television network

Religious

Nour TV (UAE), an Iranian Sunni Islamic religious satellite television network based in the United Arab Emirates